Charles Washington Criss Jr. (born November 6, 1948) is an American former professional basketball player born in Valhalla, New York.

A 5'8" guard from New Mexico State University, Criss began his professional career in the Continental Basketball Association, earning league Most Valuable Player honors with the Scranton Apollos in 1976, next playing for the Washington Generals. He joined the Atlanta Hawks of the National Basketball Association the following year, and played eight seasons in the league with the Hawks, San Diego Clippers and Milwaukee Bucks. When he entered the NBA, Criss was the league's shortest active player.

In his NBA career, Criss averaged 8.5 points and 3.2 assists per game, with perhaps his best year being his first in 1978, posting averages of 11 points and 4 assists in 77 matches. During the 1980 NBA playoffs, Criss averaged 14 points and 4.4 assists per game, as the Hawks eventually lost to the Philadelphia 76ers in the Eastern Conference Semifinals. On February 20, 1982, while on the Clippers, Criss scored a career-best 34 points and recorded 8 assists during a 118–101 win over the San Antonio Spurs. After retiring as a player, he worked as a golf instructor, an Atlanta Hawks television color commentator, a minor-league basketball coach and a basketball summer camp coordinator.

NBA career statistics

Regular season

|-
| align="left" | 1977–78
| align="left" | Atlanta
| 77 || - || 25.1 || .425 || - || .797 || 1.6 || 3.8 || 1.4 || 0.1 || 11.4
|-
| align="left" | 1978–79
| align="left" | Atlanta
| 54 || - || 16.3 || .377 || - || .779 || 1.1 || 2.6 || 0.8 || 0.1 || 5.3
|-
| align="left" | 1979–80
| align="left" | Atlanta
| 81 || - || 22.1 || .431 || .059 || .811 || 1.4 || 3.0 || 0.9 || 0.0 || 8.3
|-
| align="left" | 1980–81
| align="left" | Atlanta
| 66 || - || 25.9 || .454 || .048 || .864 || 1.5 || 4.3 || 0.9 || 0.0 || 9.5
|-
| align="left" | 1981–82
| align="left" | Atlanta
| 27 || 0 || 20.4 || .400 || .250 || .890 || 1.4 || 2.8 || 0.9 || 0.1 || 8.7
|-
| align="left" | 1981–82
| align="left" | San Diego
| 28 || 20 || 30.0 || .479 || .381 || .884 || 1.6 || 4.0 || 0.8 || 0.1 || 12.9
|-
| align="left" | 1982–83
| align="left" | Milwaukee
| 66 || 0 || 14.0 || .451 || .194 || .895 || 1.2 || 1.9 || 0.4 || 0.0 || 6.2
|-
| align="left" | 1983–84
| align="left" | Milwaukee
| 6 || 0 || 17.8 || .367 || .167 || .636 || 1.5 || 2.8 || 0.8 || 0.0 || 5.0
|-
| align="left" | 1983–84
| align="left" | Atlanta
| 9 || 0 || 12.0 || .409 || .000 || 1.000 || 1.2 || 2.3 || 0.3 || 0.0 || 2.6
|-
| align="left" | 1984–85
| align="left" | Atlanta
| 4 || 2 || 28.8 || .412 || .000 || .667 || 3.5 || 5.5 || 0.8 || 0.0 || 4.5
|- class="sortbottom"
| style="text-align:center;" colspan="2"| Career
| 418 || 22 || 21.4 || .432 || .179 || .831 || 1.4 || 3.2 || 0.9 || 0.1 || 8.5
|}

Playoffs

|-
| align="left" | 1977–78
| align="left" | Atlanta
| 2 || - || 32.5 || .417 || - || .778 || 2.0 || 1.5 || 2.0 || 0.5 || 13.5
|-
| align="left" | 1978–79
| align="left" | Atlanta
| 9 || - || 11.0 || .414 || - || .900 || 0.6 || 1.8 || 0.3 || 0.0 || 3.7
|-
| align="left" | 1979–80
| align="left" | Atlanta
| 5 || - || 30.4 || .492 || .333 || .917 || 1.0 || 4.4 || 1.2 || 0.0 || 14.0
|-
| align="left" | 1982–83
| align="left" | Milwaukee
| 9 || - || 12.9 || .441 || .000 || .944 || 1.6 || 1.3 || 1.0 || 0.0 || 5.2
|- class="sortbottom"
| style="text-align:center;" colspan="2"| Career
| 25 || - || 17.3 || .452 || .250 || .898 || 1.1 || 2.1 || 0.9 || 0.0 || 7.1
|}

See also
List of shortest players in National Basketball Association history

References

External links

1948 births
Living people
20th-century African-American sportspeople
21st-century African-American people
African-American basketball coaches
African-American basketball players
Albuquerque Silvers players
American men's basketball players
Atlanta Hawks players
Basketball players from New York (state)
Hartford Capitols players
Lancaster Lightning players
Milwaukee Bucks players
National Basketball Association broadcasters
New Mexico State Aggies men's basketball players
NMJC Thunderbirds men's basketball players
People from Valhalla, New York
Point guards
San Diego Clippers players
Undrafted National Basketball Association players
Washington Generals players